Donald Edwin Westlake (July 12, 1933 – December 31, 2008) was an American writer, with more than a hundred novels and non-fiction books to his credit. He specialized in crime fiction, especially comic capers, with an occasional foray into science fiction and other genres. Westlake created two professional criminal characters who each starred in a long-running series: the relentless, hardboiled Parker (published under the pen name Richard Stark), and John Dortmunder, who featured in a more humorous series.

He was a three-time Edgar Award winner, and alongside Joe Gores and William L. DeAndrea was one of few writers to win Edgars in three different categories (1968, Best Novel, God Save the Mark; 1990, Best Short Story, "Too Many Crooks"; 1991, Best Motion Picture Screenplay, The Grifters). In 1993, the Mystery Writers of America named Westlake a Grand Master, the highest honor bestowed by the society.

Personal life
Westlake was born in Brooklyn, New York, the son of Lillian (Bounds) and Albert Joseph Westlake, and was raised in Albany, New York.

Westlake wrote constantly in his teens, and after 200 rejections, his first short story sale was in 1954. Sporadic short story sales followed over the next few years, while Westlake attended Champlain College (a now defunct college created in the post WWII GI Bill boom) of Plattsburgh, New York, and Binghamton University in Binghamton, New York. He also spent two years in the United States Air Force.

Westlake moved to New York City in 1959, initially to work for a literary agency while writing on the side.  By 1960, he was writing full-time.  His first novel under his own name, The Mercenaries, was published in 1960; over the next 48 years, Westlake published a variety of novels and short stories under his own name and a number of pseudonyms.

He was married three times, the final time to Abigail Westlake (also known as Abby Adams Westlake and Abby Adams), a writer of nonfiction (her two published books are An Uncommon Scold and The Gardener's Gripe Book). The couple moved from New York City to Ancram in upstate New York in 1990.

Westlake died of a heart attack on December 31, 2008, while on the way to a New Year's Eve dinner, while he and his wife were on vacation in Mexico.

Pseudonyms
In addition to writing consistently under his own name, Westlake published under several pseudonyms. In the order they debuted:

 Rolfe Passer: An early Westlake story was published under this name in Mystery Digest in 1958.  Rolfe Passer was actually the assistant editor of the magazine at the time.  It is not known why the story was published under Passer's name; frequent Westlake collaborator Lawrence Block has suggested "editorial incompetence".
 Richard Stark: Westlake's best-known continuing pseudonym was that of Richard Stark. The Stark pseudonym was notable both for the sheer amount of writing credited to it (far more than any other except Westlake's real name itself), as well as for Stark's particular style of writing, which was colder, darker, less sentimental, and less overtly humorous than Westlake's usual prose. For a period in the late 1960s, the popularity of the Parker series made Stark's name more well-known and more lucrative for Westlake than his real name. According to Westlake, he chose the name "Richard Stark" for actor Richard Widmark, whose performance in the film Kiss of Death impressed Westlake: "part of the character's fascination and danger is his unpredictability. He's fast and mean, and that's what I wanted the writing to be: crisp and lean, no fat, trimmed down ... stark." Westlake described the difference between Stark's style and his usual style in a 2001 article for the New York Times Book Review: "Stark and Westlake use language very differently. To some extent they're mirror images. Westlake is allusive, indirect, referential, a bit rococo. Stark strips his sentences down to the necessary information." Stark debuted in 1959, with a story in Mystery Digest. Four other Stark short stories followed through 1961, including "The Curious Facts Preceding My Execution", later the title story in Westlake's first short-story collection.  Then, from 1962 to 1974, sixteen novels about the relentless and remorseless professional thief Parker and his accomplices (including larcenous actor Alan Grofield) appeared and were credited to Richard Stark. After Butcher's Moon in 1974, Westlake unexpectedly found himself unable to tap into what he called Stark's "personality." Despite repeated attempts to bring him back, Westlake was unsatisfied. Years later, when Westlake had been hired to write the screenplay for The Grifters, director Stephen Frears was so impressed by its lean, cold attitude that he insisted that the screenplay had been written by Stark, not Westlake, and even tried to get Stark's name officially credited as the writer. Westlake said that "I got out of that one by explaining Richard Stark wasn't a member of the Writer's Guild. I don't think he's a joiner, actually." Stark was inactive until 1997, when Westlake once again began writing and publishing Parker novels under Stark's name beginning with Comeback.  The University of Chicago began republishing the Richard Stark novels in 2008. George Stark, the central villain in Stephen King's 1989 novel The Dark Half, was named in honor of Richard Stark. King telephoned Westlake personally to ask permission. King's own pseudonym Richard Bachman was named for the book King was reading at the time (a Richard Stark novel) and the music he was listening to at the time (Bachman-Turner Overdrive).
 Alan Marshall (or Alan Marsh):  Westlake acknowledged writing as many as 28 paperback soft-porn titles from 1959 to 1964 under these names; titles include All My Lovers, Man Hungry, All About Annette, Sally, Virgin's Summer, Call Me Sinner, Off Limits, and three featuring the character of Phil Crawford: Apprentice Virgin, All the Girls Were Willing, and Sin Prowl.  Westlake was not the only author to work under Marshall's name, claiming: "The publishers would either pay more for the names they already knew or would only buy from (those) names…so it became common practice for several of us to loan our names to friends…. Before…the end of 1961…six other people, friends of mine, published books as Alan Marshall, with my permission but without the publishers' knowledge."  Two novels published in 1960 by Midwood Books were co-authored by Westlake and Lawrence Block (who used the pen-name "Sheldon Lord") and were credited to "Sheldon Lord and Alan Marshall": A Girl Called Honey, dedicated to Westlake and Block, and So Willing, dedicated to "Nedra and Loretta," who were (at that time) Westlake and Block's wives.
James Blue: one-shot pseudonym, used as a third name circa 1959 when both Westlake and Stark already had stories in a magazine issue. In actuality, the name of Westlake's cat.
 Ben Christopher: one-shot pseudonym for a 1960 story in 77 Sunset Strip magazine, based on the characters from the TV show of the same name.
 John Dexter: a house pseudonym used by Nightstand Books for the work of numerous authors.  The very first novel credited to John Dexter is a soft-core work by Westlake called No Longer A Virgin (1960)
 Andrew Shaw: pseudonym used by Westlake and Lawrence Block for their 1961 collaborative soft-core novel Sin Hellcat.  Like John Dexter (above), "Andrew Shaw" was a house pseudonym used by a wide variety of authors.
 Edwin West: Brother and Sister, Campus Doll, Young and Innocent, all 1961; Strange Affair, 1962; Campus Lovers, 1963, one 1966 short story.
 John B. Allan: Elizabeth Taylor: A Fascinating Story of America's Most Talented Actress and the World's Most Beautiful Woman, 1961, biography.
 Don Holliday: pseudonym used by Westlake for two collaborative soft-core novels (with various authors, including Hal Dresner and Lawrence Block) in 1963/64.
 Curt Clark: debuted in 1964 with the short story "Nackles".  Novel: Anarchaos, 1967, science fiction.
 Barbara Wilson: one co-authored novel with Laurence Janifer (The Pleasures We Know, 1964); Janifer also used this name for at least one solo novel with no involvement from Westlake.
 Tucker Coe: five mystery novels featuring the character of Mitch Tobin: Kinds of Love, Kinds of Death, 1966; Murder Among Children, 1967; Wax Apple and A Jade in Aries, both 1970; Don't Lie to Me, 1972.
 P. N. Castor: pseudonym used for one 1966 short story co-authored with Dave Foley.
 Timothy J. Culver: Ex Officio, 1970, thriller.
 J. Morgan Cunningham: Comfort Station, 1971, humor.  Cover features the blurb, "I wish I had written this book! –  Donald E. Westlake."
 Samuel Holt: four mystery novels featuring the character of Sam Holt, 1986-1989: One of Us is Wrong and I Know a Trick Worth Two of That, both 1986; What I Tell You Three Times is False, 1987; The Fourth Dimension is Death, 1989. Westlake used the Holt pseudonym as an experiment to see if he could succeed as an author under a new name; he was dismayed when his publisher revealed the true identity of "Holt" simultaneously with the release of the first book.  Westlake subsequently delivered all four books he had contracted for as Holt, but abandoned plans to write at least two further books in the series.
 Judson Jack Carmichael: The Scared Stiff, 2002, mystery; UK editions dropped the pseudonym.

Westlake sometimes made playful use of his pseudonyms in his work:
 John Dortmunder and associates plan a kidnapping based on a mythical Richard Stark/Parker novel in Westlake's Jimmy The Kid.  Stark himself makes an appearance in the novel.
 Richard Stark's character of Parker has ID that gives his name as "John B. Allan".
 In the film version of The Grifters (for which Westlake wrote the screenplay), a key scene takes place at the firm of Stark, Coe and Fellows. Westlake explains the in-joke in the film's DVD commentary track, noting that he wrote books as "Richard Stark, Tucker Coe and some other fellows."  Westlake had been asked to write the script for The Grifters using the pen-name "Richard Stark" as an in-joke, but insisted on using his own name.
 A character in Timothy J. Culver's Ex Officio works for Coe-Stark Associates.
 In the Mitch Tobin novel A Jade in Aries, Tobin phones a friend, who briefly mistakes Tobin for somebody named Don Stark.

Additionally, Westlake conducted a mock "interview" with Richard Stark, Tucker Coe and Timothy J. Culver in an article for the non-fiction book Murder Ink: The Mystery Reader's Companion.

Writing style
Donald Westlake was known for the great ingenuity of his plots and the audacity of his gimmicks. Westlake's most famous characters include the hard-boiled criminal Parker (appearing in fiction under the Richard Stark pseudonym) and Parker's comic flip-side John Dortmunder. Westlake was quoted as saying that he originally intended what became The Hot Rock to be a straightforward Parker novel, but "It kept turning funny," and thus became the first John Dortmunder novel.

Most of Donald Westlake's novels are set in New York City. In each of the Dortmunder novels, there is typically a foray into a particular city neighborhood. He wrote just two non-fiction books: Under an English Heaven, regarding the unlikely 1967 Anguillan "revolution", and a biography of Elizabeth Taylor.

Westlake was an occasional contributor to science fiction fanzines such as Xero, and used Xero as a venue for a harsh announcement that he was leaving the science fiction field.

Literary crossovers 
Westlake and Joe Gores wrote the same encounter between two of their characters from different perspectives in two different novels. In Chapter 18 of Gores' 1972 novel Dead Skip, San Francisco detective Dan Kearney meets Westlake's amoral thief Parker while looking for one of Parker's associates. The sequence is described from Parker's viewpoint in the 1972 book Plunder Squad, which Westlake wrote under the pseudonym Richard Stark. Gores hints further at the connection between the two books by referring to Parker's associates as "the plunder squad."  Additionally, earlier in the novel, the book's protagonist Larry Ballard is described as being a reader only of Richard Stark novels.

Gores and Westlake also wrote a shared chapter in Westlake's Drowned Hopes and Gores' 32 Cadillacs, having the characters in those books influenced by the same event.

Motion pictures and television

Several of Westlake's novels have been made into motion pictures: 1967's Point Blank (based on The Hunter) with Lee Marvin as Parker (changed to Walker);  (based on The Score) with Michel Constantin as Parker (changed to Georges), also in 1967; 1968's The Split (from the book The Seventh) with Jim Brown as Parker (changed to McClain); The Hot Rock in 1972 with Robert Redford; Cops and Robbers in 1973; The Outfit with Robert Duvall as Parker (changed to Macklin), also in 1973; Bank Shot in 1974 with George C. Scott; The Busy Body (with an "all-star cast") in 1967; Slayground with Peter Coyote as Parker (changed to Stone) in 1983; Why Me? with Christopher Lambert, Christopher Lloyd, and J. T. Walsh in 1990; Payback in 1999, the second film made from The Hunter, with Mel Gibson as Parker (changed to Porter); What's the Worst That Could Happen? in 2001 with Martin Lawrence as Dortmunder (changed to Kevin Caffery); Constantin Costa-Gavras adapted The Ax for the European screen in 2005, to great critical and public acclaim – entitled Le Couperet, the film takes place in France and Belgium rather than the novel's setting of New England; Parker in 2013, based on Flashfire, with Jason Statham as Parker.

In his introduction to one of the short stories in Thieves' Dozen, Westlake mentioned legal troubles with Hollywood over his continued use of the Dortmunder novel characters;  the movie studios attempted to assert that he had sold the rights to the characters to them permanently as a result of the Redford film.

The novel Two Much! has been adapted twice: in France as Le Jumeau (The Twin) in 1984; and in the U.S. as Two Much in 1995, starring Antonio Banderas and Melanie Griffith.

Jean-Luc Godard's Made in U.S.A. in 1966 was an extremely loose adaptation of The Jugger. Neither the film's producer nor Godard purchased the rights to the novel, so Westlake successfully sued to prevent the film's commercial distribution in the United States.

His novel Memory, published posthumously in 2010, was adapted into the upcoming film The Actor, directed by Duke Johnson and starring André Holland and Gemma Chan.

Westlake was himself a screenwriter. His script for the 1990 film The Grifters, adapted from the novel by Jim Thompson, was nominated for an Academy Award. Westlake adapted Jim Thompson's work in a straightforward manner, but Westlake the humourist played on Thompson's name later that year in the Dortmunder novel Drowned Hopes by featuring a character named "Tom Jimson" who is a criminal psychopath. Westlake also wrote the screenplay for the film The Stepfather (from a story by Westlake, Brian Garfield and Carolyn Lefcourt), which was popular enough to inspire two sequels and a remake, projects in which Westlake was not involved.

In 1987 Westlake wrote the teleplay Fatal Confession, a pilot for the TV series Father Dowling Mysteries based on the novels by Ralph McInerny. He also appeared in a small role (as the mystery writer Rich Vincent) in the third-season episode, "The Hardboiled Mystery."

While the seventeenth James Bond film GoldenEye was in post-production, Westlake  wrote story treatments for the eighteenth James Bond film (eventually titled Tomorrow Never Dies) in collaboration with Bond series writer-producer Michael G. Wilson. None of Westlake's ideas made it into the completed film, but in 1998 the author used the first treatment as the basis for a novel, Fall of the City. The existence of the novel (and its connection to the Bond treatments) was revealed in an article published in issue #32 of the magazine MI6 Confidential; the article also provides a detailed analysis of the two treatments. Fall of the City was published under the title Forever and a Death in June 2017 by Hard Case Crime.

Westlake co-wrote the story for the pilot of the ill-fated 1979 TV series Supertrain with teleplay writer Earl W. Wallace; Westlake and Wallace shared "created by" credit.

Works

Novels

Collections
 The Curious Facts Preceding My Execution (1968)
 Enough! ("A Travesty" & "Ordo") (1977) - reissued as Double Feature in 2021
 Levine (1984)
 Tomorrow's Crimes (1989), includes the novel Anarchaos
 Horse Laugh and Other Stories (1991)
 The Parker Omnibus, Volume 1 (1997), published in UK, containing The Man with the Getaway Face, The Outfit, and The Deadly Edge.
 The Parker Omnibus, Volume 2 (1999), published in UK, containing The Split (alternate name for The Seventh), The Score, and The Handle.
 A Good Story and Other Stories (1999)
 Thieves' Dozen (2004), a collection of ten Dortmunder short stories and one related story.
Transgressions (2005), Ed McBain-edited collection of 10 novellas, including Westlake's Dortmunder novella "Walking Around Money"

Non-fiction
 Elizabeth Taylor: A Fascinating Story of America's Most Talented Actress and the World's Most Beautiful Woman (1961, as "John B. Allan")
 Under an English Heaven (1972)
 The Getaway Car: A Donald Westlake Nonfiction Miscellany (2014)

Produced screenplays
 Cops and Robbers (1973)
 Hot Stuff (1979) co-written with Michael Kane
 The Stepfather (1987)
 Why Me? (1990) – based on Westlake's novel, co-written with Leonard Maas, Jr. (pseudonym of David Koepp)
 The Grifters (1990) – based on the novel by Jim Thompson
 Ripley Under Ground (2005) – based on the novel by Patricia Highsmith, co-written with William Blake Herron

Unpublished/unproduced works
 The Score (1965–1967) – screenplay based on Westlake's Richard Stark novel (later adapted as Alain Cavalier's Mise à sac)
 Murder at the Vanities (1990–1991) – mystery stage musical; libretto by Westlake, music and lyrics by Donald Oliver & David Spencer
 God's Pocket (1996–1997) – screenplay based on the Pete Dexter novel (later adapted as God's Pocket)
 Maximum Bob – screenplay based on the Elmore Leonard novel (later adapted as a TV series, Maximum Bob)
 Arms of Nemesis – screenplay based on the novel by Steven Saylor
 Absolute Faith – original screenplay co-written with Ghasem Ebrahimian

References

External links

 Official webpage
 
 
 
 
 FantasticFiction: Comprehensive bibliography
 DBratman.net: Annotated booklist
 Web site devoted to the Parker novels written as Richard Stark
 "A Storyteller Who Got the Details Right". Annotated bibliography by Ethan Iverson
 Blog examining each of Westlake's novels in detail--still ongoing
 An interview with Donald Westlake
 "Donald E. Westlake, Mystery Writer, Is Dead at 75", The New York Times, January 1, 2009
 AP Obituary in The New York Times
 Nackles Story
  Westlake talking about his work and life.
 Donald Westlake / Stark bibliography at HARD-BOILED site (Comprehensive Bibliographies by Vladimir)
 University of Chicago Interview 2008, upon republication of three of the Richard Stark "Parker" novels.
  What if NYC were a character in a mystery novel?

1933 births
2008 deaths
20th-century American novelists
20th-century American male writers
21st-century American novelists
21st-century American male writers
American crime fiction writers
American erotica writers
American male novelists
Anthony Award winners
Binghamton University alumni
Edgar Award winners
Novelists from New York (state)
Shamus Award winners
United States Air Force airmen
Writers from Brooklyn